George Alexander Morrow (11 August 1877 – 15 November 1914) was an Irish cricketer and badminton player.

He made his debut for Ireland against South Africa in August 1907, and went on to play for them on eight occasions, his last game coming in July 1912, also against South Africa. All but one of his games for Ireland had first-class status. He also represented Ireland at badminton.

References
 CricketEurope Stats Zone profile

Irish male badminton players
Irish cricketers
People from Nenagh
1877 births
1914 deaths
Sportspeople from County Tipperary
Woodbrook Club and Ground cricketers
Gentlemen of Ireland cricketers